Adelaide "Su-Lin" Young (23 December 1911 – 17 April 2008) was an American explorer, journalist, and disc jockey.  A Chinese American, she was the first American woman to explore the Himalayas in the 1930s and Su Lin, the first giant panda brought to the United States, was named for her.

She was born in New York City to Ming Tai Chen, the wealthy owner of the famed China Doll Night Club and graduated from Wesleyan College in Macon, Georgia.

In 1934, she arrived in southwestern China as a newlywed with her husband Jack Young and his younger brother Quentin Young to gather animal specimens and catalog plants for the American Museum of Natural History on an expedition financed by Theodore Roosevelt Jr. and Kermit Roosevelt, sons of former U.S. President Theodore Roosevelt.

After exploring parts of China, Tibet, and India, Young worked as a reporter in Shanghai for the English-language North China Daily News and Arthur Sowerby's China Journal.  In Shanghai, Young met explorer Ruth Harkness, another American woman, who captured the first giant panda to be sent the United States.  Harkness named the panda Su Lin for Young, a name also given to Su Lin, a panda born in 2005 at the San Diego Zoo.

After relocating several times in China due to the Second Sino-Japanese War (World War II) Young left China after the Chinese Communist Party takeover in 1949.  She spent time as a radio disk jockey in Taiwan for the United States Armed Forces Network Radio Taiwan (now ICRT) attached to the Military Assistance Advisory Group (MAAG) Taiwan.

Young returned to the United States in the 1950s living in Virginia, California, and North Carolina.  She died at age 96 in Hercules, California.

References
Chris Treadway. "Life of 'Panda Lady' celebrated." Contra Costa Times. 16 May 2008. Retrieved 5 June 2008.
"'Su-Lin' Young, 96; Explorer Lent Her Name to Pandas" (Obituary). Washington Post. 20 May 2008. Retrieved 5 June 2008.
Patricia Sullivan. "Adelaide 'Su-Lin' Young, 96, Explorer and Panda Namesake" The New York Sun. 22 May 2008. Retrieved 15 Jan 2019.
Chris Treadway. "Life of ‘Panda Lady’ celebrated" East Bay Times. 17 May 2008. Retrieved 15 Jan 2019.

External links
Adelaide "Su-Lin" Young Photo Gallery at SFGate.com.

Explorers of the Himalayas
American explorers
Republic of China journalists
Wesleyan College alumni
1911 births
2008 deaths
American writers of Chinese descent
Journalists from New York City
Female explorers